Fernán Sánchez de Badajoz was a member of the prominent Sánchez de Badajoz family. In 1369, he took over multitudes of property in Barcarrota, near Badajoz, granted by Enrique II. He had a son, Garci.

References

Spanish landlords
Year of birth missing
Year of death missing
People from Badajoz
14th-century landowners